Beth Calkin (born 25 August 1971) is a Canadian sailor. She competed in the Europe event at the 2000 Summer Olympics.

References

External links
 

1971 births
Living people
Canadian female sailors (sport)
Olympic sailors of Canada
Sailors at the 2000 Summer Olympics – Europe
Sportspeople from Halifax, Nova Scotia